Aneta is a city in Nelson County, North Dakota, United States. The population was 234 at the 2020 census. Aneta was first settled in 1882 and incorporated as a city in 1893.

History

Aneta was first settled in 1882.  It was named after Anna Roseta Mitchell, the first woman settler in the community. Because the Sheyenne River flows nearby, the town was nicknamed, "The Queen City of the Upper Sheyenne." In 1896, the Great Northern Railway extended a branch line 28 miles from Hope to Aneta and the city quickly became a boomtown.

In 1893, Aneta incorporated as a city, which in North Dakota required a population of 500. At the time, its population was 512. Only 100 residents voted in the election – 59 for, 39 against, and two spoiled votes. A subsequent election for mayor (held in Thayer Hall) resulted in Mayor George F. Thayer. Municipal services were provided to residents as follows: school in 1897, telephone in 1899, electric lights in 1912, civic auditorium in 1927, water in 1955, sewer in 1960, and paved streets in 1965.

Aneta's Post Office was established in 1883 and a railroad station established 1896. Aneta was incorporated as a village in October 1897 and as a city on May 14, 1903. (ND Centennial Blue Book Page 502)

Geography
Aneta is located at  (47.679923, −97.989231).

Demographics

2010 census
As of the census of 2010, there were 222 people, 107 households, and 53 families residing in the city. The racial makeup of the city was 96.8% White, 0.9% Native American, and 2.3% from two or more races. Hispanic or Latino of any race were 0.9% of the population.

There were 107 households, of which 14.0% had children under the age of 18 living with them, 34.6% were married couples living together, 9.3% had a female householder with no husband present, 5.6% had a male householder with no wife present, and 50.5% were non-families. 47.7% of all households were made up of individuals, and 27.1% had someone living alone who was 65 years of age or older. The average household size was 1.73 and the average family size was 2.36.

The median age in the city was 60.7 years. 9.9% of residents were under the age of 18; 7.8% were between the ages of 18 and 24; 10.4% were from 25 to 44; 27.5% were from 45 to 64; and 44.6% were 65 years of age or older. The gender makeup of the city was 50.9% male and 49.1% female.

2000 census
As of the census of 2000, there were 284 people, 124 households, and 62 families residing in the city. The population density was 288.8 people per square mile (111.9/km2). There were 155 housing units at an average density of 157.6 per square mile (61.1/km2). The racial makeup of the city was 97.54% White, 1.06% Native American, 0.70% Asian, 0.35% from other races, and 0.35% from two or more races. Hispanic or Latino of any race were 0.70% of the population.

The top 6 ancestry groups in the city are Norwegian (46.1%), German (13.7%), Swedish (6.3%), English (3.9%), Irish (2.8%), Italian (1.8%).

There were 124 households, out of which 14.5% had children under the age of 18 living with them, 41.9% were married couples living together, 6.5% had a female householder with no husband present, and 49.2% were non-families. 46.8% of all households were made up of individuals, and 27.4% had someone living alone who was 65 years of age or older. The average household size was 1.82 and the average family size was 2.49.

In the city, the population was spread out, with 16.5% under the age of 18, 3.9% from 18 to 24, 18.3% from 25 to 44, 18.7% from 45 to 64, and 42.6% who were 65 years of age or older. The median age was 60 years. For every 100 females, there were 102.9 males. For every 100 females age 18 and over, there were 86.6 males.

The median income for a household in the city was $24,792, and the median income for a family was $33,125. Males had a median income of $25,500 versus $15,625 for females. The per capita income for the city was $14,848. About 7.8% of families and 14.7% of the population were below the poverty line, including 8.6% of those under the age of eighteen and 4.0% of those 65 or over.

References

External links
 Aneta Diamond Jubilee (1971) from the Digital Horizons website

Cities in North Dakota
Cities in Nelson County, North Dakota
Populated places established in 1882
1882 establishments in Dakota Territory